"How Low" is a hip hop song by American rapper Ludacris. It is the lead single from his seventh studio album, Battle of the Sexes. The song premiered at the BET Hip Hop Awards in Atlanta, which took place on October 10, 2009. However, the ceremony was aired on October 27, 2009. It was performed by Ludacris as the second half of a medley that began with Lil Scrappy's "Addicted to Money", a song in which he is featured.  The track was produced by Canadian producer T-Minus. The song was released via iTunes on December 8, 2009. The song debuted on the U.S. Billboard Hot 100 at 13.  The music video was filmed on December 23, 2009 in Los Angeles, California and was directed by Dave Meyers. The music video leaked on the internet on January 20, 2010.  The single is Ludacris’ best-selling single as a lead artist with sales of 2,216,000 units as of August, 2012, and it has been certified double platinum by the RIAA.

Background
"How Low" was officially released as the lead single from Ludacris' Battle of the Sexes album on December 8, 2009. Prior to the single's release, Ludacris performed the song live on October 10, 2009 at the BET Hip Hop Awards in Atlanta, Georgia. The track samples Public Enemy's "Bring the Noise" as the primary vocals in the chorus, additional vocals by Carla Henderson.

The song was  Nominated for the Grammy's 2011 Best Rap Solo Performance but lost to Eminem's 'Not Afraid'.

Official remixes and freestyles
There are two different versions of the official remix. 
 The first remix, which features Rick Ross and Twista, was leaked on January 27, 2010.
 The second features Ciara and Pitbull. Ciara sings part of the hook on her remix and adds her own verse. The remix was scheduled for released to on February 9, 2010. It is included on the deluxe edition of the album. The remix was leaked on February 2, 2010.

Remixes
 Ludacris feat. Yelawolf & Rock City - How Low
 Ludacris feat. Rick Ross & Twista - How Low
 Ludacris feat. Ciara & Pitbull - How Low (Official Remix)
 Ludacris feat. Carmelo - How Low
 Ludacris feat. Lil' Rob & Pitbull - How Low (Latino Remix)
 Ludacris feat. Ciara & Chris Brown - How Low
 Ludacris feat. Chris Brown & Twista - How Low
 Ludacris feat. Pitbull, Carmelo, Twista, & Chris Brown - How Low
 The-Dream & Ciara - How Low
 Thieves Like Us - Silence (Dance Mix feat. Ludacris)
 Rock City - How Low (Freestyle)
 Chris Brown - How Low Can You Go (Freestyle)
 Twista - How Low (Freestyle)
 Benzmixer - LOW RIDDIM (ft Ludacris)

Music video
The video begins with three girls in a bedroom for a sleepover. They begin by talking directly into a camcorder, in which they reveal that there is a rumor that if you "go low" enough in front of a mirror, Ludacris will appear. They begin dancing to the song in front of a mirror, and Ludacris' face appears in the reflection and starts rapping. The girls are visibly excited at the sight and continue dancing. The video progresses with shots of Ludacris in a club with a black light. Back in the bedroom, Ludacris, backup dancers and masked men burst out of the mirror and into the room. The girls, scared, run downstairs and into another room to hide. Ludacris and his dancers come down the stairs and eventually find the girls. Ludacris magically tears off the girls' clothing and changes them into erotic dancers. More people begin to appear and throw a party in the house as all of the girls dance. The video then changes over to different girls, changing in a locker room. Similarly to the original girls, the girls in the locker room also state the rumor and  decide to test it by dancing low in front of the mirror in the same hopes of seeing Ludacris. The following scene shows Ludacris at the original party, rapping in front of the dancing girls outside of the house. However, because the girls in the locker room have started to "go low", Ludacris begins to fade, while giving off some type of electrostatic discharge. He then appears in the mirror inside the locker room and the whole concept of the video apparently restarts. The video features a cameo from Disturbing tha Peace artist Lil Fate.

Charts

Year-end charts

Certifications

References

External links

2009 singles
2010 singles
Ludacris songs
Music videos directed by Dave Meyers (director)
Songs written by Ludacris
Song recordings produced by T-Minus (record producer)
2009 songs
Songs written by Chuck D
Songs written by T-Minus (record producer)
Def Jam Recordings singles
Songs written by Hank Shocklee